Plogonnec is a commune and small town in the Finistère department of Brittany in north-western France. The town is twinned with Llandysul in Wales.

Geography

Panoramic views to the coast are available from the Montagne du Prieuré. Much of the land is agricultural but there are several protected areas of woodland. To the west is the extensive Bois du Nevet which offers opportunities for hiking.

History
The Seigneures of Névet headed a clan and were one of the oldest and most influential families in the Cornouaille. Their lands included both the west and east parts of the commune but the central part was under the control of the Princes of the House of Rohan under the direct authority of the Bishops of Cornouaille. At the end of the sixteenth century, the French Wars of Religion devastated the parish which was also affected by the Revolt of the Bonnets Rouges in 1675.

Notable buildings
Besides the Church of Saint-Thurien de Plogonnec there are a number of chapels dating from the 16th and 17th centuries. Particularly notable is the Chapel of Saint Théleau the evangelist which is known for its intricate sculptures and is classed as an ancient monument. There are also secular historic buildings in the town including mansions, wash houses, mills and farmhouses. Facilities include primary schools, kindergartens, shops, bars and restaurants.

Twinning
Plogonnec is twinned with Llandysul in West Wales, a small town in a similar rural area. The purpose of the twinning is to promote cultural and commercial ties between the two. Members of the communities have exchanged hospitality and have united for various events in both Brittany and Wales.

Population
The population of Plogonnec has varied over the last two centuries between around 2000 inhabitants to its present level of just over 3000, with the highest level of 3365 in 1911. Inhabitants of Plogonnec are called in French Plogonnecois(es) or Plogonistes.

See also
Communes of the Finistère department
Roland Doré sculptor

References
This article incorporates material from the French Wikipedia

External links

Official website 

Communes of Finistère